France was represented by Sofia Mestari, with the song "On aura le ciel", at the 2000 Eurovision Song Contest, which took place on 13 May in Stockholm. This was the second year in which broadcaster France 3 had been in charge of the French participation, and as in 1999 they opted to choose their entry via public selection, with a national final being organised on 15 February 2000. However the poor result obtained by Nayah in 1999 followed by the even worse result in 2000, together with the controversy surrounding the 2000 selection process, led to France 3 changing to internal selection in the years following, initially with much greater success.

Before Eurovision

Eurovision 2000: la sélection 
Eurovision 2000: la sélection was the national final organised by France 3 to select France's entry for the Eurovision Song Contest 2000. The competition took place on 15 February 2000 at the L'Olympia in Paris and hosted by Julien Lepers and Karen Cheryl. The show was broadcast on France 3.

Competing entries 
France 3 requested proposals from record companies in October 1999. A three-member selection committee reviewed the received proposals, shortlisted twenty entries after an audition round and selected fourteen to compete in the national final. The selection committee consisted of Nathalie André (producer), Catherine Régnier (M6 music programmer) and Fabrice Ferment (Head of Delegation for France at the Eurovision Song Contest). The competing artists and songs were announced on 6 January 2000.

Final 
The final took place on 15 February 2000. Fourteen entries competed and the winner, "On aura le ciel" performed by Sofia Mestari, was selected by the combination of public televoting (50%) and a jury panel (50%). The jury panel included Marie Myriam and Patrick Fiori who represented France in the 1977 and 1993 Contests respectively.

Controversy 
A degree of controversy arose when it became known that "On aura le ciel" had been placed first by the jury but "Espoir" performed by Jessica Ferley had won the public vote, receiving 27,000 votes out of the 43,000 registered. The explanation of France 3 that "On aura le ciel" came second in the televote while "Espoir" was ranked only fourth by the jury prompted complaints that in the event of the televote and jury vote coming up with different winners, the televote should have taken precedence, otherwise there was a degree of dishonesty in asking the public to pay to vote, only for their choice to be overruled by a small group of jurors (A similar controversy would later engulf the 2005 Swedish selection).

At Eurovision 
On the night of the final Mestari performed fifth in the running order, following Estonia and preceding Romania. At the close of voting "On aura le ciel" had received only 5 points, placing France 23rd of the 24 entries, ahead only of Belgium. This was the second time in three contests that France had finished one place off the bottom, and led to reiterated claims that the wrong song for a televoting environment had been sent. The 12 points from the French televote were awarded to Turkey.

Voting

References 

2000
Countries in the Eurovision Song Contest 2000
Eurovision
Eurovision